Claude Green (24 November 1906 – 3 February 1986) was a South African cricketer. He played in four first-class matches for Eastern Province in 1929/30.

See also
 List of Eastern Province representative cricketers

References

External links
 

1906 births
1986 deaths
South African cricketers
Eastern Province cricketers
Cricketers from Port Elizabeth